That's Where It's At! is an album by blues musician John Lee Hooker recorded in 1961 collecting five tracks originally released on a split album by Guest Star Records in 1966 along with five unreleased tracks, that was issued by the Stax label in 1969.

Reception

AllMusic reviewer Richie Unterberger stated: "A characteristic solo outing with moody compositions and that doomy one-electric-guitar-and-stomping-foot ambience, That's Where It's At! is one of Hooker's sparer and more menacing post-'50s outings".

Track listing
All compositions credited to John Lee Hooker
 "Teachin' the Blues" – 3:24
 "Goin' to Louisiana" – 4:40
 "I Need You" – 2:56
 "My Love Comes Down for You" – 3:27
 "Please Don't Go" – 2:47
 "I Just Don't Know" – 3:46
 "Slow and Easy" – 3:07
 "Two White Horses" – 3:55
 "Feel So Bad" – 7:47
 "Grinder Man" – 3:54

Personnel
John Lee Hooker – guitar, vocals

References

John Lee Hooker albums
1969 albums
Stax Records albums